Foster Paul  Stockwell (born February 17, 1929, in Bartlesville, Oklahoma) is an American writer, historian and publishing consultant for Chinese publishers and authors.

Biography

He is the son of Francis Olin and Esther Stockwell, two Methodist missionaries who went to Fuzhou, Fujian, in 1929 then to Chengdu, Sichuan, in 1939. He grew up and went to primary school in Chengdu, in southwestern China, in the 1940s.

His father, Olin Stockwell, spent two years in prison in the town of Chongqing as a suspected spy just after the establishment of the People's Republic of China and wrote a book about it: With God in Red China.

Foster Stockwell attended several universities. He married on December 16, 1955 (his wife's name: Rhoda). They have one child, Norman.

He is the author of books dealing with subjects as diverse as religion in China, information storage and retrieval, American communes, the exploration of China, genealogical research, misinterpretations of the Bible.

Foster Stockwell has visited China many times in the last decades.

He has been an editor for two major encyclopedias, a newspaper editor (Berrien County Record, Buchanan, Michigan, 1960–61), and a publishing consultant for Chinese publishers and authors. He lives in Des Moines, Washington.

Works

Boyang Zuo, Foster Stockwell (eds), Recent discoveries in Chinese archaeology: 28 articles by Chinese archaeologists describing their excavations, translated by Boyang Zuo, Foster Stockwell, Bowen Tang, Foreign Languages Press, 1984, 107 pages   
Jichuang Hu, Foster Stockwell, Shuhan Zhao, Chinese economic thought before the seventeenth century, Foreign Languages Press, 1984, 107 pages  
Mount Huashan, Famous Chinese mountains, Foreign Language Press, 1987, 120 pages   
Religion in China Today, New World Press, (original 1993, second revised edition 2007), 277 pages  
Foster Stockwell, Encyclopedia of American Communes, 1663–1963, Jefferson, North Carolina, 1998, 267 pages 
Tibet - Myth and Reality, by American historian Foster Stockwell, original source: China Today, April 1998, vol. 47, issue 4
A History of Information Storage and Retrieval, McFarland & Company, 2001, 208 pages 
 Highlights in the History of Exploration and Trade in China, Foreign languages Press, 2002, 272 pages  
Westerners in China: A History of Exploration and Trade, Ancient Times Through the Present, McFarland, 2003, 187 pages  (reviewed in China Information October 2003 vol. 17 no. 2 146-147)
A Sourcebook for Genealogical Research: Resources Alphabetically by Type and Location, McFarland, 2004, 336 pages 
The Bible Says: History of Abuses Committed in the Name of the Biblical Text, Lulu Press, 2007, 236 pages

References

American male writers
1929 births
Living people
People from Bartlesville, Oklahoma
Writers from Chengdu
People from Des Moines, Washington
Historians from Sichuan